Mint is a deprecated server-based web analytics tool. It tracks traffic trends, HTTP referrers, and search trends.

The developer Shaun Inman discontinued sales and support on December 24, 2016.

See also 

 Web analytics
 List of web analytics software

References

External links 

 
 Personal site of Shaun Inman, designer/developer of Mint

Web analytics